Cylindrepomus astyochus is a species of beetle in the family Cerambycidae. It was described by Dillon and Dillon in 1948.

References

Dorcaschematini
Beetles described in 1948